Mitchey Greig (born 4 October 1988) is a freestyle skier from New Zealand. In the 2010 Winter Olympics at Vancouver, she came 30th in the woman’s ski cross.

External links 
Mitchey Greig at the NZOC website
Mitchey Greig at the SR Sports Reference website
Michelle Greig (sic) at the ISF website

Living people
1988 births
New Zealand female freestyle skiers
Olympic freestyle skiers of New Zealand
Freestyle skiers at the 2010 Winter Olympics